Pyramix is the first remix album and sixth album by rapper/DJ, Egyptian Lover.  The album was released in 1993 for Egyptian Empire Records and was produced by The Egyptian Lover himself.  The album was both a commercial and critical failure and did not make it to any billboard charts or feature any hit singles.

Track listing
"Pyramix" – 1:56
"Dance" – 1:53
"The Lover" – 5:26
"I Want Cha" – 2:19
"Computer Power (Version II)" – 5:25
"Kinky Nation (Kingdom Kum)" – 2:34
"Egypt, Egypt" – 6:44
"Planet E (Remix)" – 7:04
"Egypt's Revenge (Mega Mix)" – 5:27
"Get High, Get X'D, Get Drunk, Get Sex'd" – 5:48

References

Egyptian Lover albums
Albums produced by Egyptian Lover
1993 remix albums